Ivo Norman Ron Viver (born 16 January 1967) is a retired Ecuadorian football (soccer) attacking midfielder.

International career
He was a member of the Ecuador national football team for four years, and obtained a total number of ten caps during his career, scoring three goals. He made his debut on 5 June 1991 against Peru.

Honours

Club
 Club Sport Emelec
 Serie A de Ecuador: 1988, 1994

Individual
 Club Sport Emelec
 Serie A de Ecuador: Best Player 1994

References

1967 births
Living people
Ecuadorian footballers
Ecuador international footballers
1991 Copa América players
1995 Copa América players
Association football midfielders
C.S. Emelec footballers
S.D. Quito footballers
Sportspeople from Guayaquil